Mickey Spillane's Mike Hammer may refer to:

 Mickey Spillane's Mike Hammer (1958 TV series), starring Darren McGavin.
 Mickey Spillane's Mike Hammer (1984 TV series), starring Stacy Keach.
 Mike Hammer, the detective character created by Mickey Spillane

See also
 Michael Hammer (disambiguation)
 Mickey Spillane